The 1979 Spanish motorcycle Grand Prix was the fifth round of the 1979 Grand Prix motorcycle racing season. It took place on the weekend of 18–20 May 1979 at the Circuito Permanente del Jarama.

Classification

500 cc

References

Spanish motorcycle Grand Prix
Spanish
Motorcycle
Spanish motorcycle Grand Prix